The U.S. Post Office and Courthouse–Billings, in Billings, Montana, was built in 1914.  It was listed on the National Register of Historic Places in 1986.

It includes Late 19th and 20th Century Revivals architecture and Second Renaissance Revival architecture.  Also known as Billings Post Office and Courthouse and as Billings Downtown Station, it served historically as a courthouse of the United States District Court for the District of Montana, and as a post office. The courthouse functions have since been relocated to the James F. Battin U.S. Courthouse.

The building's construction was touted as a great thing for Billings, and its opening was a matter of great pride for the city.  The building was expanded and renovated in 1932.

References

External links
Historic Federal Courthouses, at General Services Administration

Post office buildings on the National Register of Historic Places in Montana
Courthouses on the National Register of Historic Places in Montana
Government buildings completed in 1914
Buildings and structures in Billings, Montana
Renaissance Revival architecture in Montana
Former federal courthouses in the United States
National Register of Historic Places in Yellowstone County, Montana
1914 establishments in Montana